A living fossil is an extant taxon that cosmetically resembles related species known only from the fossil record. To be considered a living fossil, the fossil species must be old relative to the time of origin of the extant clade. Living fossils commonly are of species-poor lineages, but they need not be. While the body plan of a living fossil remains superficially similar, it is never the same species as the remote relatives it resembles, because genetic drift would inevitably change its chromosomal structure.

Living fossils exhibit stasis (also called "bradytely") over geologically long time scales. Popular literature may wrongly claim that a "living fossil" has undergone no significant evolution since fossil times, with practically no molecular evolution or morphological changes. Scientific investigations have repeatedly discredited such claims.

The minimal superficial changes to living fossils are mistakenly declared as an absence of evolution, but they are examples of stabilizing selection, which is an evolutionary process—and perhaps the dominant process of morphological evolution.

Characteristics

Living fossils have two main characteristics, although some have a third:
 Living organisms that are members of a taxon that has remained recognisable in the fossil record over an unusually long time span.
 They show little morphological divergence, whether from early members of the lineage, or among extant species. 
 They tend to have little taxonomic diversity.
The first two are required for recognition as a living fossil status; some authors also require the third, others merely note it as a frequent trait.

Such criteria are neither well-defined nor clearly quantifiable, but modern methods for analyzing evolutionary dynamics can document the distinctive tempo of stasis. Lineages that exhibit stasis over very short time scales are not considered living fossils; what is poorly-defined is the time scale over which the morphology must persist for that lineage to be recognized as a living fossil.

The term "living fossil" is much misunderstood in popular media in particular, in which it often is used meaninglessly. In professional literature the expression seldom appears and must be used with far more caution, although it has been used inconsistently.

One example of a concept that could be confused with "living fossil" is that of a "Lazarus taxon", but the two are not equivalent; a Lazarus taxon (whether a single species or a group of related species) is one that suddenly reappears, either in the fossil record or in nature, as if the fossil had "come to life again". In contrast to "Lazarus taxa", a living fossil in most senses is a species or lineage that has undergone exceptionally little change throughout a long fossil record, giving the impression that the extant taxon had remained identical through the entire fossil and modern period. Because of the mathematical inevitability of genetic drift, though, the DNA of the modern species is necessarily different from that of its distant, similar-looking ancestor. They almost certainly would not be able to cross-reproduce, and are not the same species.

The average species turnover time, meaning the time between when a species first is established and when it finally disappears, varies widely among phyla, but averages about 2–3 million years. A living taxon that had long been thought to be extinct could be called a Lazarus taxon once it was discovered to be still extant. A dramatic example was the order Coelacanthiformes, of which the genus Latimeria was found to be extant in 1938. About that there is little debate — however, whether Latimeria resembles early members of its lineage sufficiently closely to be considered a living fossil as well as a Lazarus taxon has been denied by some authors in recent years.

Coelacanths disappeared from the fossil record some 80 million years ago (upper Cretaceous) and, to the extent that they exhibit low rates of morphological evolution, extant species qualify as living fossils. It must be emphasised that this criterion reflects fossil evidence, and is totally independent of whether the taxa had been subject to selection at all, which all living populations continuously are, whether they remain genetically unchanged or not.

This apparent stasis, in turn, gives rise to a great deal of confusion — for one thing, the fossil record seldom preserves much more than the general morphology of a specimen. To determine much about its physiology is seldom possible; not even the most dramatic examples of living fossils can be expected to be without changes, no matter how persistently constant their fossils and the extant specimens might seem. To determine much about noncoding DNA is hardly ever possible, but even if a species were hypothetically unchanged in its physiology, it is to be expected from the very nature of the reproductive processes, that its non-functional genomic changes would continue at more-or-less standard rates. Hence, a fossil lineage with apparently constant morphology need not imply equally constant physiology, and certainly neither implies any cessation of the basic evolutionary processes such as natural selection, nor reduction in the usual rate of change of the noncoding DNA.

Some living fossils are taxa that were known from palaeontological fossils before living representatives were discovered. The most famous examples of this are:
 Coelacanthiform fishes (2 species)
 Metasequoia, the dawn redwood discovered in a remote Chinese valley (1 species)
 glypheoid lobsters (2 species)
 mymarommatid wasps (10 species)
 eomeropid scorpionflies (1 species)
 jurodid beetles (1 species)
 soft sea urchins (59 species)
All the above include taxa that originally were described as fossils but now are known to include still-extant species.

Other examples of living fossils are single living species that have no close living relatives, but are survivors of large and widespread groups in the fossil record. For example:
 Ginkgo biloba
 Syntexis libocedrii, the cedar wood wasp
 Dinoflagellates (typified on coccoid dinocysts: occasionally calcareous cell remnants)
All of these were described from fossils before later being found alive.

The fact that a living fossil is a surviving representative of an archaic lineage does not imply that it must retain all the "primitive" features (plesiomorphies) of its ancestral lineage. Although it is common to say that living fossils exhibit "morphological stasis", stasis, in the scientific literature, does not mean that any species is strictly identical to its ancestor, much less remote ancestors.

Some living fossils are relicts of formerly diverse and morphologically varied lineages, but not all survivors of ancient lineages necessarily are regarded as living fossils. See for example the uniquely and highly autapomorphic oxpeckers, which appear to be the only survivors of an ancient lineage related to starlings and mockingbirds.

Evolution and living fossils 
The term living fossil is usually reserved for species or larger clades that are exceptional for their lack of morphological diversity and their exceptional conservatism, and several hypotheses could explain morphological stasis on a geologically long time-scale. Early analyses of evolutionary rates emphasized the persistence of a taxon rather than rates of evolutionary change. Contemporary studies instead analyze rates and modes of phenotypic evolution, but most have focused on clades that are thought to be adaptive radiations rather than on those thought to be living fossils. Thus, very little is presently known about the evolutionary mechanisms that produce living fossils or how common they might be. Some recent studies have documented exceptionally low rates of ecological and phenotypic evolution despite rapid speciation. This has been termed a "non-adaptive radiation" referring to diversification not accompanied by adaptation into various significantly different niches. Such radiations are explanation for groups that are morphologically conservative. Persistent adaptation within an adaptive zone is a common explanation for morphological stasis. The subject of very low evolutionary rates, however, has received much less attention in the recent literature than that of high rates

Living fossils are not expected to exhibit exceptionally low rates of molecular evolution, and some studies have shown that they do not. For example, on tadpole shrimp (Triops), one article notes, "Our work shows that organisms with conservative body plans are constantly radiating, and presumably, adapting to novel conditions.... I would favor retiring the term ‘living fossil’ altogether, as it is generally misleading." Some scientists instead prefer a new term stabilomorph, being defined as "an effect of a specific formula of adaptative strategy among organisms whose taxonomic status does not exceed genus-level. A high effectiveness of adaptation significantly reduces the need for differentiated phenotypic variants in response to environmental changes and provides for long-term evolutionary success."

The question posed by several recent studies pointed out that the morphological conservatism of coelacanths is not supported by paleontological data. In addition, it was shown recently that studies concluding that a slow rate of molecular evolution is linked to morphological conservatism in coelacanths are biased by the a priori hypothesis that these species are ‘living fossils’. Accordingly, the genome stasis hypothesis is challenged by the recent finding that the genome of the two extant coelacanth species L. chalumnae and L. menadoensis contain multiple species-specific insertions, indicating transposable element recent activity and contribution to post-speciation genome divergence. Such studies, however, challenge only a genome stasis hypothesis, not the hypothesis of exceptionally low rates of phenotypic evolution.

History
The term was coined by Charles Darwin in his On the Origin of Species from 1859, when discussing Ornithorhynchus (the platypus) and Lepidosiren (the South American lungfish):

Other definitions

Long-enduring 

A living taxon that lived through a large portion of geologic time.

The Australian lungfish (Neoceratodus fosteri), also known as the Queensland lungfish, is an example of an organism that meets this criterion. Fossils identical to modern specimens have been dated at over 100 million years old. Modern Queensland lungfish have existed as a species for almost 30 million years. The contemporary nurse shark has existed for more than 112 million years, making this species one of the oldest, if not actually the oldest extant vertebrate species.

Resembles ancient species 
A living taxon morphologically and/or physiologically resembling a fossil taxon through a large portion of geologic time (morphological stasis).

Retains many ancient traits 

A living taxon with many characteristics believed to be primitive.

This is a more neutral definition. However, it does not make it clear whether the taxon is truly old, or it simply has many plesiomorphies. Note that, as mentioned above, the converse may hold for true living fossil taxa; that is, they may possess a great many derived features (autapomorphies), and not be particularly "primitive" in appearance.

Relict population 
Any one of the above three definitions, but also with a relict distribution in refuges.

Some paleontologists believe that living fossils with large distributions (such as Triops cancriformis) are not real living fossils. In the case of Triops cancriformis (living from the Triassic until now), the Triassic specimens lost most of their appendages (mostly only carapaces remain), and they have not been thoroughly examined since 1938.

Low diversity 
Any of the first three definitions, but the clade also has a low taxonomic diversity (low diversity lineages).

Oxpeckers are morphologically somewhat similar to starlings due to shared plesiomorphies, but are uniquely adapted to feed on parasites and blood of large land mammals, which has always obscured their relationships. This lineage forms part of a radiation that includes Sturnidae and Mimidae, but appears to be the most ancient of these groups. Biogeography strongly suggests that oxpeckers originated in eastern Asia and only later arrived in Africa, where they now have a relict distribution.

The two living species thus seem to represent an entirely extinct and (as Passerida go) rather ancient lineage, as certainly as this can be said in the absence of actual fossils. The latter is probably due to the fact that the oxpecker lineage never occurred in areas where conditions were good for fossilization of small bird bones, but of course, fossils of ancestral oxpeckers may one day turn up enabling this theory to be tested.

Operational definition 
An operational definition was proposed in 2017, where a 'living fossil' lineage has a slow rate of evolution and occurs close to the middle of morphological variation (the centroid of morphospace) among related taxa (i.e. a species is morphologically conservative among relatives). The scientific accuracy of the morphometric analyses used to classify tuatara as a living fossil under this definition have been criticised however, which prompted a rebuttal from the original authors.

Examples
Some of these are informally known as "living fossils".

Bacteria
 Cyanobacteria – the oldest living fossils, emerging 3.5 billion years ago. They exist as single bacteria but are most often pictured as stromatolites, artificial rocks produced by cyanobacteria waste.

Protists
 The dinoflagellate †Calciodinellum operosum.
 The dinoflagellate †Dapsilidinium pastielsii.
 The dinoflagellate †Posoniella tricarinelloides.
 The coccolithophore Tergestiella adriatica.

Plants
 Moss
Pteridophytes
 Horsetails – Equisetum
 Lycopods 
 Tree ferns and ferns 
Gymnosperms
 Conifers
Agathis – kauri in New Zealand, Australia and the Pacific and almasiga in the Philippines
 Araucaria araucana – the monkey puzzle tree (as well as other extant Araucaria species)
 Metasequoia – dawn redwood (Cupressaceae; related to Sequoia and Sequoiadendron)
 Sciadopitys – a unique conifer endemic to Japan known in the fossil record for about 230 million years.
 Taiwania cryptomerioides – one of the largest tree species in Asia.
 Wollemia tree (Araucariaceae – a borderline example, related to Agathis and Araucaria)
 Cycads
 Ginkgo tree (Ginkgoaceae)
 Welwitschia
Angiosperms
 Amborella – a plant from New Caledonia, possibly closest to base of the flowering plants
 Trapa – water caltrops, seeds, and leaves of numerous extinct species are known all the way back to the Cretaceous.
 Nelumbo – several species of lotus flower are known exclusively from fossils dating back to the Cretaceous.

Fungi
 Neolecta

Animals
 
Vertebrates
 

 Mammals
 Aardvark (Orycteropus afer)
 Amami rabbit (Pentalagus furnessi)
Nesolagus (Asian striped rabbits)
 Chevrotain (Tragulidae)
Chousingha (Tetracerus quadricornis)
 Elephant shrew (Macroscelidea)
 Laotian rock rat (Laonastes aenigmamus)
 Monito del monte (Dromiciops gliroides)
 Monotremes (the platypus and echidna)
 Mountain beaver (Aplodontia rufa)
 Okapi (Okapia johnstoni)
Sumatran rhinoceros (Dicerorhinus sumatrensis)
 Opossums (Didelphidae)
 Clouded leopard (Neofelis nebulousa)
 Capybara (Hydrochoerus hydrochaeris)
Bush dog (Speothos venaticus)
Maned wolf (Chrysocyon brachyurus)
 Red panda (Ailurus fulgens)
 Solenodon (Solenodon cubanus and Solenodon paradoxus)
 Shrew opossum (Caenolestidae)
 Spectacled bear (Tremarctos ornatus)
 False killer whale (Pseudorca crassidens)
 Pygmy right whale (Caperea marginata)
Pacarana (Dinomys branickii)
 Birds
 Pelicans (Pelecanus) – form has been virtually unchanged since the Eocene, and is noted to have been even more conserved across the Cenozoic than that of crocodiles.
 Acanthisittidae (New Zealand "wrens") – 2 living species, a few more recently extinct. Distinct lineage of Passeriformes.
 Broad-billed sapayoa (Sapayoa aenigma) – One living species. Distinct lineage of Tyranni.
 Bearded reedling (Panurus biarmicus) – One living species. Distinct lineage of Passerida or Sylvioidea.
Picathartes (rockfowls)
 Coliiformes (mousebirds) – 6 living species in 2 genera. Distinct lineage of Neoaves.
 Hoatzin (Ophisthocomus hoazin) – One living species. Distinct lineage of Neoaves.
 Magpie goose (Anseranas semipalmata) – One living species. Distinct lineage of Anseriformes.
 Seriema (Cariamidae) – 2 living species. Distinct lineage of Cariamae.
 Tinamiformes (tinamous) 50 living species. Distinct lineage of Palaeognathae.
 Reptiles
 Crocodilia (crocodiles, gavials, caimans and alligators)
 Pig-nosed turtle (Carettochelys insculpta)
Hickatee (Dermatemys mawii)
 Snapping turtle (Chelydridae) family
 Tuatara (Sphenodon punctatus and Sphenodon guntheri)
Asian forest tortoise (Manouria emys)
Impressed tortoise (Manouria impressa)
Sunbeam snake (Xenopeltis hainanensis and Xenopeltis unicolor)
Leatherback sea turtle (Dermochelys coriacea)
 Amphibians
 Giant salamanders (Cryptobranchus and Andrias)
 Hula painted frog (Latonia nigriventer)
 Purple frog (Nasikabatrachus sahyadrensis)
 

 Jawless fish
 Hagfish (Myxinidae) family
 Lamprey (Petromyzontiformes)
 Bony fish
 Arowana and arapaima (Osteoglossidae)
 Bowfin (Amia calva)
 Coelacanth (the lobed-finned Latimeria menadoensis and Latimeria chalumnae)
 Gar (Lepisosteidae)
 Queensland lungfish (Neoceratodus fosteri)
 African lungfish (Protopterus sp.)
 Sturgeons and paddlefish (Acipenseriformes)
 Bichir (family Polypteridae)
 Protanguilla palau
 Mudskipper (Oxudercinae)
 Sharks
 Blind shark (Brachaelurus waddi)
 Bullhead shark (Heterodontus sp.)
 Cow shark (sixgill sharks and relatives) (Hexanchidae)
 Elephant shark (Callorhinchus milii)
 Frilled shark (Chlamydoselachus sp.)
 Goblin shark (Mitsukurina owstoni)
 Gulper shark (Centrophorus sp.)

Invertebrates
 Insects
 Helorid wasps (1 living genus, 11 extinct genera)
 Mantophasmatodea (gladiators; a few living species)
 Meropeidae (3 living species, 4 extinct)
 Micromalthus debilis (a beetle)
 Mymarommatid wasps (10 living species in genus Palaeomymar)
 Nevrorthidae (3 species-poor genera)
 Nothomyrmecia (known as the 'dinosaur ant')
 Notiothauma reedi (a scorpionfly relative)
 Orussidae (parasitic wood wasps; about 70 living species in 16 genera)
 Peloridiidae (peloridiid bugs; fewer than 30 living species in 13 genera)
 Rhinorhipid beetles (1 living species, Triassic origin)
 Rotoitid wasps (2 living species, 14 extinct)
 Sikhotealinia zhiltzovae (a jurodid beetle)
 Syntexis libocedrii (Anaxyelidae cedar wood wasp)
 Cyatta abscondita (most recent common relative of Atta and Acromyrmex ant genera)
 Crustaceans
 Glypheoidea (2 living species: Neoglyphea inopinata and Laurentaeglyphea neocaledonica)
 Stomatopods (mantis shrimp)
 Triops cancriformis (also known as tadpole shrimp; a notostracan crustacean)
 Molluscs
 Nautilina (e.g., Nautilus pompilius)
 Neopilina - Monoplacophoran
 Slit snail (e.g., Entemnotrochus rumphii)
 Vampyroteuthis infernalis – the vampire squid
 Other invertebrates
 Crinoids
 Horseshoe crabs (only 4 living species of the class Xiphosura, family Limulidae)
 Lingula anatina (an inarticulate brachiopod)
 Liphistiidae (trapdoor spiders)
 Onychophorans (velvet worms)
 Rhabdopleura (a hemichordate)
 Valdiviathyris quenstedti (a craniforman brachiopod)
 Paleodictyon nodosum (unknown)

See also
 Relict (biology)
 Breeding back
 Lazarus taxon

References

External links

MyTriops introduces Triops as living fossils

Evolutionary biology concepts
Extinction
Fossils